The Energy Act 2011 (c 16) is a UK Act of Parliament relating to UK enterprise law and energy in the UK.

Contents
Chapter 1, sections 1 to 41 contain an "Energy Company Obligation", requiring the "big six" energy providers (those with over 250k domestic customers, SI 2012/3018 art 4) to deliver efficiency measures to domestic users. This had three components: 
(1) Carbon Emissions Reduction Obligation.
(2) Carbon Saving Community Obligation, requires suppliers to fund insulation and connections in low income areas, and a proportion rural. 
(3) Home Heating Cost Reduction Obligation, individually targeted fuel poverty alleviation, requiring energy companies to fund Green Deal qualified projects.

Chapters 2 and 3, sections 42 to 65 contain provisions on rented sectors in England, Wales and Scotland.

Chapter 4 is entitled "Reducing carbon emissions and home heating costs".

Chapter 5 concerns information about energy consumption, including smart meters.

Part 2 contains provisions on security of energy supplies, including the following:
sections 82-83, SS can determine that someone gets access to infrastructure without an application being made, after a reasonable time in which an agreement is not reached. 
sections 94-102, Energy Supply Company Administration Order, if there is no willing buyer and a large number of customers, a court can appoint an administrator to keep the supplier trading until it can refinance, or a buyer is found, or customers are transferred to other suppliers. The govt can give financial assistance until then. 
section 108, Carbon dioxide pipelines are in upstream regulation, used for carbon capture and storage.

Significance
From 2013 a Coalition flagship policy called the Green Deal was to begin, to update housing stock. With an additional charge on electricity bills, consumers could install energy efficient improvements, the charge running with the electricity meter. The government ended funding for the Green Deal Finance Co in July 2015. It seemed property owners were deterred from using it. (‘It did not provide the government with the kind of instrumental control that CERT did.’) CCC, Report to Parliament 2013, 122 criticised the Green Deal’s lack of takeup.

See also
UK enterprise law
UK energy law

Notes

United Kingdom enterprise law
United Kingdom Acts of Parliament 2011